Scamander Vallis is an ancient river valley in the Arabia quadrangle of Mars, located at 16 North and 331.5 West.  It is 204 km long and was named after an ancient name of a river in Troy.

References 

Valleys and canyons on Mars
Arabia quadrangle